Madera Community Hospital was a not-for-profit community health resource and is not associated with any other hospital or health system.  The hospital is locally governed by a Board of Trustees which provides governance and oversight. The board is composed of over a dozen community and business leaders. Madera Community Hospital was founded in 1971 and is located at 1250 E. Almond Avenue in Madera, California. The hospital contains 106 acute care beds, a 16-bed Emergency Department and a 10-bed Intensive Care Unit. Madera Community Hospital also operates two rural health care clinics and a home health agency.

Madera Community Hospital is fully accredited by the American Osteopathic Association's Healthcare Facilities Accreditation Program (HFAP), by the Clinical Laboratory Improvement Act, 1988 (CLIA) program, and is a member of the Hospital Council of Northern and Central California and the California Healthcare Association.

On January 3, 2023, Madera Community Hospital shuttered and filed for bankruptcy.

References

External links
This hospital in the CA Healthcare Atlas A project by OSHPD

Hospital buildings completed in 1971
Madera, California
Hospitals in California
Hospitals established in 1971
Buildings and structures in Madera County, California
Companies that filed for Chapter 11 bankruptcy in 2023